{{DISPLAYTITLE:L-threo-3-Methylaspartate}}

-threo-3-Methylaspartate is an unusual amino acid formed by glutamate mutase and can be metabolised by methylaspartate ammonia-lyase. It is found in the structures of the antibiotics friulimicin and vicenistatin and in carbon metabolism of haloarchaea (Methylaspartate cycle).

References

Amino acids